From Dusk till Doom is the second studio album by Norwegian metal band Stonegard.

Track listing 
 From Dusk till Doom – 3:54
 The Last Good Page – 3:24
 Morpheon – 3:38
 Crooked Feathers – 4:18
 Helios, Cursed – 3:21
 Rescue – 4:30
 S&C – 2:55
 Blade – 4:59
 Locust – 4:41

2006 albums
Stonegard albums